The 2022 Baku FIA Formula 2 round was a motor racing event held between 10 and 12 June 2022 at the Baku City Circuit, Baku, Azerbaijan. It was the sixth round of the 2022 FIA Formula 2 Championship and was held in support of the 2022 Azerbaijan Grand Prix.

Classification

Qualifying 
Jüri Vips took his second pole position of the year for Hitech Grand Prix, ahead of fellow Red Bull Junior Team drivers Liam Lawson and Dennis Hauger.

Sprint race

Feature race 
The Feature Race was originally scheduled to be completed for 29 laps before the race distance was being shortened due to the maximum race time being reached after multiple Safety Car periods.

Notes:
 – Ralph Boschung has been given a three-place grid penalty for causing a multiple car collision on the final lap of the Sprint Race.
 – Jack Doohan originally finished fifth, but was given a five-second time penalty for causing a collison with Liam Lawson, ultimately dropping him down to thirteenth place.

Standings after the event 

Drivers' Championship standings

Teams' Championship standings

 Note: Only the top five positions are included for both sets of standings.

See also 
 2022 Azerbaijan Grand Prix

References

External links 
 Official website

|- style="text-align:center"
|width="35%"|Previous race:
|width="30%"|FIA Formula 2 Championship2022 season
|width="40%"|Next race:

Baku
Baku Formula 2
Baku Formula 2